Mahender may refer to several people:

In arts and entertainment:
 Mahender Singh Shekhawat, a writer of Rajasthani literature
 S. Mahender, director of the films Preethigagi and Gandana Mane (seeKannada films of 2007)

In politics:
 P. Mahender Reddy,  an Indian politician and legislator from Tandur, Telangana state, India
 Mahender Buddha, village leader of Jagadevpur, Andhra Pradesh
 Mahender Rawat, a leader in the Uttarakhand Kranti Dal political party in India
 Mahender Singh, transport minister and deputy for Dharampur in the Legislative Assembly of Himachal Pradesh

Other people:
 Mahender Sabhnani, an American perfume maker convicted for slavery
 Raja Mahendra Pratap Singh (1886–1979), a freedom fighter, journalist, writer and revolutionary social reformist of India
 Mahender Rathor, an Indian sports official coach of the India national basketball team

Fictional characters:
 Mahender, a fictional character in the film Ijaazat
 Thakur Mahender Pratap Singh, a fictional character in the Indian horror film Veerana
 Balu Mahendar, a fictional a character in the 2007 Kannada film Hudugaata